The Peavey Classic 50 amplifiers are guitar amplifiers produced by Peavey Electronics. The three models include the Classic 50 212, Classic 50 410. and the classic 50 amplifier stack, which consisted of a matching amplifier head and speaker cabinet. They are tube amplifiers designed for Blues, Country and Rock musicians. The Classic 50 amplifiers are members of the Classic Series.

Common characteristics
Four EL84 power tubes and three 12AX7 preamp tubes
Solid state rectifier
Fan cooled
2-channel preamp
Normal and bright inputs
Pre- and post-gain controls on lead channel
Presence control
3-band passive EQ (bass, middle, treble)
Master volume control
Standby switch
Reverb level control
Effects loop on 1992 and later
Footswitch control for reverb and channel switching
External speaker capability
50 watts (rms) into 16 or 8 ohms
Four 10 inch (410) or two 12 inch (212) Blue Marvel speakers

References

Instrument amplifiers
Peavey amplifiers